Simon Gerard Kirby (born 22 December 1964), also known as Simon Radford-Kirby, is a British politician. A member of the Conservative Party, he was elected as the Member of Parliament (MP) for Brighton Kemptown in 2010. In 2016, he was appointed Economic Secretary to the Treasury, where he held responsibility for financial services, unofficially known as the City Minister. He lost his seat at the 2017 general election.

Early life and career

Kirby was born in Hastings, Sussex, in 1964. He attended Chantry Infants School, Sandown Primary School and Hastings Grammar School. He has a BSc(Hons) degree in mathematical modelling from the Open University and studied operational research at the London School of Economics. During the 1980s he was involved with the anarchist scene in Hastings and was present at an alternative party organised by anarchists on the West Hill for the wedding of Mr Andrew Windsor (Prince Andrew).

Kirby established a number of successful businesses in a variety of industries in the Brighton area, including playing a part in establishing Surf 107, a Brighton independent radio station, later renamed Juice 107.2. He worked with Martin Webb to found the Webb Kirby (later C-Side) pub, restaurant and nightclub chain in the city employing over 200 people. He has been a school governor at a number of schools.

Elected as a councillor in 1992 on Brighton Borough Council, Kirby later also served on Mid Sussex District Council and East Sussex County Council, where he was the cabinet member with responsibility for economic development. He stood down as a councillor in 2009 to concentrate on winning the parliamentary seat of Brighton Kemptown.

Parliamentary career
He was elected to the House of Commons as MP for Brighton Kemptown in the May 2010 general election, with a majority of 1,328, gaining the seat from Labour. He was later listed as one of 20 Conservative MPs said to have "true grit" by the ConservativeHome website.

Following his election to parliament, Kirby became vice-chair of the All Party Parliamentary Group on HIV/AIDS and served on the Business, Innovation and Skills and Administration Select Committees. Since becoming a member of parliament he has also become a patron of the Sussex Beacon and the Sussex & Kent ME/CFS Society.

In 2012, Kirby was appointed as the Parliamentary Private Secretary (PPS) to the Minister for Sport and Tourism Hugh Robertson. In October 2013, he was promoted to PPS to the Minister of State for the Foreign and Commonwealth Office, also Robertson. In August 2014 Kirby was promoted to the role of PPS to the Secretary of State for Health, Jeremy Hunt.

Following Kirby's re-election at the May 2015 general election, with a reduced majority of 690 votes, but increasing his share of the vote by 2.7%, he was appointed as an Assistant Government Whip on 13 May 2015. Kirby was opposed to Brexit prior to the 2016 European membership referendum.

In July 2016, Kirby was appointed as Economic Secretary to the Treasury and City Minister. He was responsible for financial services policy and the overall strategic relationship with UK financial services. This included working with banks, insurance companies and the financial services sector. He also has an interest in pensions and savings. In January 2017, he was stripped of his responsibilities for overseeing Brexit's impact on financial services, amid reports that senior financial executives from the City of London Corporation had expressed concern at his lack of business experience and inability to provide detailed answers and assurances about how the Treasury was handling Brexit. Theresa May, however, told The Argus, that she had "absolute confidence" in Kirby as a strong advocate for Brexit. The prime minister said Kirby was still playing a Treasury role in the negotiations.

Personal life
Kirby is married to Elizabeth and has six children. He supports Brighton & Hove Albion Football Club and is an honorary vice-president of Whitehawk Football Club in his former constituency.

References

External links
Simon Kirby MP official constituency website
Simon Kirby MP Conservative Party profile
Kemptown Conservatives

Survey replies of political views at The Guardian

News articles
The Argus election candidate information
Kemptown Conservatives' announcement of his selection
Notice of election to East Sussex County Council

1964 births
Living people
Conservative Party (UK) MPs for English constituencies
UK MPs 2010–2015
Alumni of the London School of Economics
Alumni of the Open University
Members of East Sussex County Council
School governors
UK MPs 2015–2017
People from Hastings
Conservative Party (UK) councillors
People educated at Hastings Grammar School
Economic Secretaries to the Treasury
Politicians from Brighton and Hove